Bandō Mitsugorō IX (May 14, 1929 - April 1, 1999) was a Kabuki actor. He was the son-in-law of Bandō Mitsugorō VIII and the father of Bandō Mitsugorō X. He was married to Bando Mitsugoro VIII's oldest daughter, Yoshiko, in 1955. He took his stage name after the death of his father-in-law in 1975.

Filmography
Akō Rōshi (1964)
Minamoto no Yoshitsune (1966)

1929 births
1999 deaths
People from Tokyo
Kabuki actors
Male actors from Tokyo